Rangers F.C. is a football club based in Glasgow, Scotland, that competes in the Scottish Professional Football League. Since its founding in 1872, the club has had more than ten different presidents (prior to incorporation) and nineteen chairmen.

History
The club has been privately owned by stakeholders, in the form of a limited liability company before becoming a publicly owned company trading on the PLUS and AIM stock exchanges respectively. The board of directors are appointed to oversee the corporate operations of the company that owns the club with the chairman being considered as the most senior and high-profile corporate figures. In Rangers history the chairman has generally been the prominent executive on the board, although this has begun to change with the appointment of CEOs which led to some chairmen being appointed in a non-executive capacity.

From December 2012 to March 2015, the directors of the company that owns Rangers F.C., The Rangers Football Club Limited (TRFCL), were appointed to what was then known as the "football board". This football board was separate and distinct from the Plc board of Rangers International Football Club Plc (RIFC), which is the holding company of TRFCL. During this period, references were made to both the football board and Plc board and the situation effectively saw the club with two chairmen, however, since the departure of Sandy Easdale in 2015, the "football board" terminology has ceased leaving the Plc chair as the definitive Chairman.

Between June and December 2012, before flotation on the AIM stock exchange and the subsequent formation of RIFC, the chairman of TRFCL was de jure the chairman of Rangers Football Club.

List of presidents
Below is the presidential history of Rangers F.C., from 1874 until incorporation sixteen years later.

List of chairmen
Below is the official chairmen history of Rangers F.C., from the incorporation of the club in 1899, until the present day.

t/a Rangers F.C. Ltd (1899) and Rangers F.C. Plc (2000)

t/a Rangers F.C. Ltd (2012)

t/a Rangers International F.C. Plc (2012)

List of honorary positions

References

 
 
Chairmen